Ricardo Adolfo (1917 – 25 May 2005) was a Filipino boxer. He competed in the 1948 Summer Olympics.

After his retirement from being a boxer, Adolfo served as head coach of the amateur boxing team of the Adamson University which he mentored from 1969 to 1974. He also worked as a police officer in Manila. He died on May 25, 2005 in his residence in Blumentritt, Manila

1948 Olympic results
Below is the record of Ricardo Adolfo, a Filipino flyweight boxer who competed at the 1948 London Olympics:

 Round of 32: lost to Pascual Perez (Argentina) by second-round knockout

References

External links
 

1917 births
2005 deaths
Boxers at the 1948 Summer Olympics
Filipino male boxers
Olympic boxers of the Philippines
Sportspeople from Manila
Filipino police officers
People from Santa Cruz, Manila
Flyweight boxers